Baksaas is a Norwegian surname. Notable people with the surname include:

 Bendik Baksaas (born 1991), Norwegian jazz and electronica musician
 Jon Fredrik Baksaas (born 1954), Norwegian businessman

Norwegian-language surnames